DeGanahl Glacier is a narrow, steep-walled glacier about  long, flowing southeast from Jones Peak into the western side of Liv Glacier, opposite June Nunatak. It was discovered and photographed by Rear Admiral Byrd on the South Pole Flight in November 1929 and named for Joe deGanahl, a navigator and dog driver and a member of the Supporting Party for the Byrd Antarctic Expedition, 1928–30.

References

Glaciers of Dufek Coast